Hamilton College is a private, independent liberal arts college located in Clinton, New York.  It has been coeducational since 1978, when it merged with Kirkland College.

Below is a non-comprehensive list of Hamiltonians who have made notable achievements or contributions in their chosen fields.

Notable alumni

Law, government, and public affairs

Legislative branch
 David Jewett Baker, class of 1816 - U.S. Senator from Illinois
 Matt Cartwright, class of 1983 - U.S. Representative from Pennsylvania
 Michael Castle, class of 1961 - 69th Governor of Delaware, U.S. Representative from Delaware, 2010 Senate candidate (graduation speaker 2004)
 Thomas Treadwell Davis, class of 1831 - U.S. Representative from New York
 Joseph Irwin France, class of 1895 - U.S. Senator from Maryland
 Abijah Gilbert, class of 1822 - U.S. Senator from Florida
 Joseph Roswell Hawley, class of 1847 - served two terms in the United States House of Representatives; four-term U.S. Senator from Connecticut; 42nd Governor of Connecticut
 John N. Hungerford, class of 1846 - U.S. Representative from New York (1877–79)
 Irving Ives, class of 1919 - U.S. Senator from New York
 Henry B. Payne, class of 1832 - U.S. Senator from Ohio
 Theodore M. Pomeroy, class of 1842 - U.S. Representative from New York
Glenni William Scofield, class of 1840 - U.S. Representative from Pennsylvania
 Gerrit Smith, valedictorian, class of 1818 - represented Oneida and Madison, NY, Counties in U.S. House of Representatives, 1853–54. One of the founders of the Republican Party. Three times candidate for President of the United States (1848, 1856, 1860). Leading abolitionist, philanthropist, and temperance and Black and women's suffrage activist. Member of the so-called Secret Six group of abolitionists who financed John Brown's raid on Harper's Ferry.

Executive branch
 Drew S. Days, III, class of 1963 - United States Solicitor General, 1993–1996; later Alfred M. Rankin Professor of Law at Yale Law School
 Michael Dubke, class of 1992 - former White House Communications Director and former Executive Director of the Ripon Society 
 William Henry Harrison Miller, class of 1861 - United States Attorney General, 1889–1893
 Victor H. Metcalf, Law School class of 1868 - US Secretary of the Navy (1906–08)
 Ralph Oman, class of 1962 - United States copyright law luminary
 Elihu Root, class of 1864 - United States Secretary of State and recipient of the Nobel Peace Prize in 1912.
 James S. Sherman, class of 1878 - Vice President of the United States
 Tom Vilsack, class of 1972 - United States Secretary of Agriculture; 40th Governor of Iowa
 Jim Walden, class of 1988 - lawyer, former federal prosecutor with the U.S. Attorney's Office for the Eastern District of New York

Judicial branch
 Charles F. Amidon, class of 1882 - Judge for the United States District Court for the District of North Dakota
 Charles Holland Duell, class of 1871 - Judge of the United States Court of Appeals for the District of Columbia Circuit
 Randolph Moss, class of 1983 - Judge of the United States District Court for the District of Columbia
 David Aldrich Nelson, class of 1954 - Judge on the United States Court of Appeals for the Sixth Circuit
 Alfred W. Newman, class of 1857 - Wisconsin Supreme Court Justice
 Charles Prentiss Orr, class of 1879 - Judge of the United States District Court for the Western District of Pennsylvania
 Glenni William Scofield, class of 1840 - Judge of the United States Court of Claims
 Augustus Sherrill Seymour, class of 1857 - Judge of the United States District Court for the Eastern District of North Carolina
 Roger Gordon Strand, class of 1955 - Judge for the United States District Court for the District of Arizona
 Amos Madden Thayer, class of 1862 - Judge of the United States Court of Appeals for the Eighth Circuit
 John Curtiss Underwood, class of 1832 - lawyer, abolitionist politician, judge of the United States District Court for the Eastern District of Virginia
 William James Wallace, class of 1857 - Judge of the United States Court of Appeals for the Second Circuit
 Hiram Wilson, class of 1832 - Judge of the United States District Court for the Northern District of Ohio

Diplomats
 John B. Emerson, class of 1975 - United States Ambassador to Germany (2013 - present)
 Philip Jessup, class of 1917 - diplomat, international law scholar, ambassador
 Sol Linowitz, class of 1935 - attorney, diplomat; negotiated return of the Panama Canal
 William H. Luers, class of 1951 - U.S. Ambassador to Czechoslovakia (1983–86)
 Arnold Raphel, class of 1964 - U.S. Ambassador to Pakistan (1987–88)
 Edward S. Walker, Jr., class of 1962 - former Ambassador to Israel, Egypt, and the United Arab Emirates, Middle East Institute president, Hamilton professor

State and city politicians, attorneys, activists, and other
 Dean Alfange, class of 1922 - politician; founding member of the Liberal Party of New York; Greek-American; Zionist activist
 Mary Bonauto, class of 1983 - gay rights activist and attorney; successfully argued the Obergefell v. Hodges case that overturned state bans on same-sex marriage in 2015. 
 George W. Clinton, class of 1825 - Mayor of Buffalo, District Attorney of Ontario County, United States Attorney for the Northern District of New York, Judge of the Buffalo Superior Court
 Steve Culbertson, class of 1979 - President & Chief Executive Officer at Youth Service America
 Bruce Cutler, class of 1970 - criminal defense lawyer; attorney for John Gotti and Louis Eppolito
 George T. Downing, attended
Marc Elias, class of 1990 - voting rights attorney, founder of Democracy Docket
 Bela Hubbard, class of 1834 - Michigan pioneer, writer, geologist, lawyer, lumberman 
 William A. Jacobson, class of 1981, conservative commentator and clinical professor at Cornell Law School
 Ron Kim, class of 2001, member of New York State Assembly and first Korean-American ever elected in New York State.
 Bob Moses, class of 1956 - civil rights activist (the Algebra Project)
 Bill Purcell, class of 1976 - mayor of Nashville
 Dan Siegel, class of 1967- Labor attorney and civil rights activist
 Lloyd Paul Stryker, class of 1906, noted American criminal defense lawyer (defended Alger Hiss)
 Theodore Dwight Weld - abolitionist
 Hiram Wilson, class of 1832 - abolitionist, educator, worked with Josiah Henson to establish the British-American Institute, delegate to the 1843 World Anti-Slavery Convention

Literature and journalism
 Samuel Hopkins Adams, class of 1891 - author and investigative journalist
 Henry Allen, class of 1963 - critic who won Pulitzer Prize for Criticism (most prominently associated with The Washington Post)
 Frank Baldwin, class of 1985 - author of Balling the Jack
 Albert Barnes, class of 1820 - theologian
 Josh Billings, class of 1840  (did not graduate) - pen name of Henry Wheeler Shaw
 Terry Brooks, class of 1966 - fantasy author
 Benjamin Woodbridge Dwight, class of 1835 - educator and author
 Alf Evers, class of 1928 (did not graduate) - historian
 Amanda Filipacchi, class of 1988 - author of Nude Men, Vapor, and Love Creeps
 Michael Greenspan, class of 1969—CNN correspondent and documentary filmmaker
 James Grinwis - poet
 George Wheeler Hinman, class of 1884 - newspaper publisher and writer
 Harry Kondoleon, class of 1977 - author and playwright, Obie Award winner
 Sarah J. Maas, class of 2008 - author of best-selling fantasy series
 Thomas Meehan, class of 1951 - wrote the books for the musicals Annie and The Producers
 John Nichols, class of 1962 - author of The Milagro Beanfield War and The Sterile Cuckoo
 Ezra Pound, class of 1905 - poet, modernist polemicist, critic
 Kamila Shamsie, class of 1995 - novelist
 Clinton Scollard, class of 1881 - poet
 Evan Smith, class of 1987  - Texas Tribune CEO and editor-in-chief
 Charles Dudley Warner, class of 1851 - essayist
 Alexander Woollcott, class of 1909 - critic and commentator; early contributor to The New Yorker; member of the Algonquin Round Table

Scientists, physicians, psychologists, mathematicians and researchers
 Lauren Ackerman, class of 1927, American physician and pathologist, who championed the subspecialty of surgical pathology in the mid-20th century.
 Edward L. Deci, class of 1964, psychologist famous for studies of human motivation ("self-determination theory")
 Paul Greengard, class of 1948 - neuroscientist awarded Nobel Prize for Physiology or Medicine in 2000
 Edward Skinner King, class of 1887 - astronomer and developer of the King Tracking Rate
 William Howell Masters, class of 1938 -physician and research pioneer in the fields of hormone replacement therapy and sexology; co-author (with Virginia E. Johnson) of Human Sexual Response (1966)
 Jonathan Schooler, class of 1981, psychologist who developed the theory of verbal overshadowing
 B.F. Skinner, class of 1926 - behavioral psychologist considered the most influential psychologist of the 20th century.
 Augustus William Smith, class of 1825 - mathematician and astronomer
 Lawrence Weed, class of 1945 - academic physician and inventor of the problem-oriented medical record
 Edward J. Wickson- class of 1868, American agronomist and researcher at University of California, Berkeley
 John Werner - class of 1992, Founding managing director for MIT Media Lab's Emerging Worlds Special Interest Group (SIG)

Academics and scholars (not otherwise listed)
 Robert Livingston Allen - linguist credited with developing "Sector Analysis" (professor at Columbia University)
 David K. Backus- financial economist (Heinz Riehl Professor at New York University's Stern School of Business)
 John J. Donohue III- law and economics scholar (professor at Yale Law School and Stanford Law School) 
 Theodore William Dwight - pioneering legal educator who served on Hamilton faculty before serving as founding dean at Columbia Law School
 Benjamin A. Elman - Sinologist (Gordon Wu '58 Professor of Chinese Studies, Princeton University)
 Samih Farsoun - influential Arab Studies scholar
 Daniel Willard Fiske (did not graduate) - archivist, chess writer (co-author of Paul Morphy) and Icelandic studies scholar at Cornell University
 Erica Flapan - mathematician 
 Charles L. Flynn, Jr. - historian and President of the College of Mount Saint Vincent 
 John M. Jacobus Jr. - art historian and Professor at Princeton University and the University of California at Berkeley
 Matthew E. Kahn - economist at Johns Hopkins University, author of Climatopolis
 Harvey J. Levin - American economist, studied spectrum allocation
 Jeffrey Mass - historian, author and Japanologist (formerly Yamato Ichihashi Professor of Japanese History at Stanford University)
 Benjamin Dean Meritt - a classical scholar, professor and epigraphist of ancient Greece (served on faculties at Princeton University, University of Michigan and the Institute for Advanced Study)
 James H. Morey - medievalist (and English professor at Emory University)
 Edward Orton Sr. - first President of Ohio State University and geologist
 Alicia Ouellette - Dean of Albany Law School
 John H. Peck - 8th President of Rensselaer Polytechnic Institute
 John Norton Pomeroy - former dean of New York University Law School
 Kosali Simon - health economist

Arts and entertainment
Otis Bigelow, class of 1943, Broadway actor and New York socialite (later, Professor at Dartmouth College)
Robert Bilheimer, class of 1966 - Academy Award-nominated documentary filmmaker, A Closer Walk
Jake Blount, class of 2017 - musician, scholar and activist.
Kevin Burns, class of 1977 - Emmy Award-winning television producer and filmmaker
Lisa Daniels, class of 1994 - MSNBC anchor
Peter Falk, class of 1949 (did not graduate) - actor, most famous for Columbo TV series
Nat Faxon, class of 1997 - Academy Award-winning screenwriter (The Descendants); actor (Grosse Pointe, Joey, Beerfest)
Helaman Ferguson, class of 1962, sculptor and mathematician
Yance Ford - producer and director
Deborah Forte, class of 1975, producer of children's television and movies (President of Scholastic Media)
Josh Gardner - actor, comedian, writer; best known as the titular character in the cult TV show Gerhard Reinke's Wanderlust
Jonathan Gilbert - actor, Little House on the Prairie
Eugene Goossen (1921–1997) - art critic and historian.
David Grubin, class of 1965,  Emmy-winning documentary filmmaker
Joe Howard, class of 1970 - actor, Mathnet
Frederick King Keller, class of 1972 - television and movie director and writer
Harry Kondoleon, class of 1977 - playwright and novelist; awarded Fulbright, National Endowment for the Arts, Rockefeller, and Guggenheim fellowships
Christopher Kostow, class of 1999 - executive chef, The Restaurant at Meadowood; James Beard Foundation Award winner and recipient of three Michelin stars
Paul Lieberstein, class of 1989 - writer and actor famous for depicting Toby Flenderson on NBC's The Office
Grayson McCouch, class of 1991 - actor, As the World Turns
Richard Nelson, class of 1972 - playwright; current director of playwriting program at Yale University
Sarah Rafferty, class of 1993 - actress, Suits, 2011–present
Jay Reise, class of 1982 - composer
Ryan Serhant, class of 2006 - actor, realtor, Million Dollar Listing New York
David Thornton, class of 1977 - actor; husband of Cyndi Lauper
Thomas Tull, class of 1992 - founder, chairman and CEO of Legendary Pictures; film producer
Melinda Wagner, class of 1979 - winner of the 1999 Pulitzer Prize in Music Composition

Business leaders
 J. Carter Bacot, class of 1955 - former chairman and CEO, Bank of New York
 David Blood, class of 1981 - co-founder (with Al Gore) and Managing Partner of Generation Investment Management; former CEO of Goldman Sachs Asset Management
 William McLaren Bristol, class of 1882 - co-founder of Bristol-Myers Squibb
 Henry Elghanayan - New York real estate developer
 Dan Ferguson, class of 1948 - former CEO of Newell Rubbermaid
 Edward Gelsthorpe, class of 1942 - marketing executive called "Cranapple Ed" for his best-known product launch
 David P. Hess, class of 1977 - President of Pratt & Whitney
 Joel Johnson, class of 1965 - CEO of Hormel (1993–2005)
 John Jay Knox, class of 1849 - financier and Comptroller of the Treasury (1867–84)
 A. G. Lafley, class of 1969 - CEO of Procter & Gamble; named one of America's Best Leaders by US News
 John Ripley Myers, class of 1887 - co-founder of Bristol-Myers Squibb
 Dan Nye, class of 1988 - former CEO of LinkedIn
 Neal Pilson, class of 1960 - former president of CBS Sports
 Marc Randolph, class of 1980 - co-founder of Netflix
 John G. Rice, class of 1978 - Vice Chairman of General Electric, and President and CEO of GE Infrastructure
 Stephen Sadove, class of 1973 - CEO of Saks Incorporated, the parent company of Saks Fifth Avenue
 Ryan Serhant, class of 2006 - Founder of SERHANT. Real estate broker, television personality, & author
 David M. Solomon, class of 1984 - CEO of Goldman Sachs

Clergy
David Riddle Breed, class of 1867 - Presbyterian theologian, author of History and Use of Hymns and Hymn Tunes
Edwin Otway Burnham, class of 1852 - rifle-shooting Presbyterian missionary in Sioux Indian territory
Benjamin Woodbridge Dwight, class of 1835, Congregationalist minister, philologist and educator 
Franklin Clark Fry, class of 1921 - President of the United Lutheran Church in America and the Lutheran Church in America
Arthur Tappan Pierson, class of 1857 - Presbyterian theologian; author of The Crisis of Missions (1886)
 George Warren Wood Jr., class of 1865 - Presbyterian missionary to Northern Michigan, missionary to the Dakota Mission, and charter member of the utopian Fairhope Single Tax Corporation

Sports
 Bill Coen, class of 1983 - head men's basketball coach, Northeastern University
 André Matias, class of 2012 - 2016 Olympic rower
 Guy Hebert, class of 1989 - professional hockey player
 Jeff Hewitt, class of 1974 - professional football player
 Garret Kramer, class of 1984 - sports psychologist
 Merritt Paulson, class of 1995 - majority owner of Portland Timbers and Portland Thorns FC
 Bill Smith, class of 1980 - General Manager, Minnesota Twins
 Kyle Smith, class of 1992 - head men's basketball coach, Washington State University
 Ward Wettlaufer, class of 1959 - amateur golfer
 Gillian Zucker, class of 1990 - former president of Auto Club Speedway, and currently president of business operations for the Los Angeles Clippers.

Alumni from works of fiction 
 Newspaper editor Charles Webb from the Thornton Wilder play Our Town
 Radio host Sheridan Whiteside from the George S. Kaufman and Moss Hart play and film The Man Who Came to Dinner, based on the real Hamilton graduate Alexander Woollcott

Notable faculty

Current members
 Frank Anechiarico - government and law
 Dennis Gilbert - sociologist, developed the Gilbert Model
Shelley Haley - Professor of Classics and Africana Studies
 Maurice Isserman - historian with notable works on the American Left, the 1960s, and mountaineering
 Derek C. Jones - economist
 Philip Klinkner - political scientist specializing in American politics
 Jack F. Matlock, Jr. - former U.S. Ambassador to Soviet Union under Reagan
 Nancy Sorkin Rabinowitz - feminist literary critic, classicist
 Heidi Ravven - expert on Jewish ethics, Spinoza, and the relationship between religion and science
 Edward S. Walker - former U.S. Ambassador to Israel, Egypt, and the UAE; Middle East specialist

Former members (both permanent and visiting)
 Agha Shahid Ali - poet, finalist for the National Book Award
 Robert C. Allen - economic historian and professor at Oxford University
 Alfred Atherton - former United States Ambassador to Egypt
 J. Brian Atwood - diplomat and former Administrator of the United States Agency for International Development
 Natalie Babbitt - author of children's literature, Tuck Everlasting
 Thomas Bass - author, The Eudaemonic Pie
 Joel Black - literary critic
 Brigitte Boisselier - Raëlian and CEO of Clonaid, the "scientific wing" of the Raëlian movement
 Hermann Carl George Brandt - German literature and language scholar 
 Francis Marion Burdick - legal scholar and longtime professor at Columbia Law School
 Mary Bucci Bush - American short story writer
 Albert Huntington Chester - geologist and mountaineer
 Richard N. Current - historian, winner of the Bancroft Prize
 Eugene Domack - American geologist
 Hubert Dreyfus - artificial intelligence philosopher and professor at University of California, Berkeley
 Sereno Edwards Dwight - intellectual historian and Congregationalist minister
 Theodore William Dwight - jurist and pioneering dean of Columbia Law School 
 Edwin Erickson - member of the Pennsylvania Senate, representing the 26th District
 James Fankhauser - conductor
 Elizabeth Flower - American philosopher
 Karl Geiringer - German-American musicologist and biographer
 Richard Haas - President of the Council on Foreign Relations
 Elaine Tuttle Hansen - president of Bates College
 Jerome B. Komisar - economist and President of the University of Alaska
 John Hiram Lathrop - first president of the University of Missouri; first chancellor of the University of Wisconsin-Madison; president of Indiana University
 George Lenczowski - political scientist and longtime professor at University of California, Berkeley
 Cheng Li - director of the John L. Thornton China Center at the Brookings Institution
 Arthur Marder - naval historian
 Chandra Talpade Mohanty - post-colonial feminist theorist
 John Monteith - first President of the University of Michigan
 Howard Nemerov - poet, twice Poet Laureate of the United States
  Jay Reise - composer, now at University of Pennsylvania
 Duncan Rice - Principal of the University of Aberdeen; former Vice-Chancellor of New York University
 David P. Robbins - mathematician
 Bernie Sanders - U.S. Senator from Vermont
 Clinton Scollard - poet
 Eve Kosofsky Sedgwick - gender theorist and cultural critic
 Kamila Shamsie - novelist
 Charles Henry Smyth, Jr. - geologist
 Leo Strauss - political philosopher and classicist
 Orest Subtelny - scholar of Ukrainian history
 Les K. Wright - gay historian and activist

Presidents of Hamilton College

 Azel Backus, 1812–16
 Henry Davis, 1817–33
 Sereno Edwards Dwight, 1833–35
 Joseph Penney, 1835–39
 Simeon North, 1839–57
 Samuel Ware Fisher, 1858–66
 Samuel Gilman Brown, 1866–81
 Henry Darling, 1881–91
 Melancthon Woolsey Stryker, 1892-1917
 Frederick Carlos Ferry, 1917–38
 William Harold Cowley, 1938–44
 David Worcester, 1945–47
Thomas Brown Rudd, 1947–49
Robert Ward McEwen, 1949–66
Richard Watrous Couper, 1966-68 (acting)
 John Wesley Chandler, 1968–73
Samuel Fisher Babbitt, 1968-78 (Kirkland College)
J. Martin Carovano, 1974–88
Harry C. Payne, 1988–93
Eugene M. Tobin, 1993-2003
Joan Hinde Stewart, 2003 -2016
 David Wippman, 2016--

References

 
Hamilton College